Guillermo Neumann (c. 1800 – c. 1860) was Mayor of Ponce, Puerto Rico, from 23 April 1851 to 30 September 1851.

Civil service
Neumann was the administrator of the Ponce Customs House in 1846.

Family life
Guillermo Neumann was father to Eduardo Neumann Gandia, who would become a prolific historian.

See also

 List of Puerto Ricans
 List of mayors of Ponce, Puerto Rico

Notes

References

Mayors of Ponce, Puerto Rico
1800s births
1860s deaths
Year of birth uncertain
Year of death uncertain